Bissegg is a village and former municipality in the canton of Thurgau, Switzerland.

History
In 1995 the municipality was merged with the other, neighboring municipalities Amlikon, Griesenberg and Strohwilen to form a new and larger municipality Amlikon-Bissegg.

It was first recorded in year 1324 as Bynssegge.

Much of the village was owned by the Abbey of St. Gallen.  During the High Middle Ages it was under the influence of the Baron of Bussnang.  Between the mid-13th Century to 1798, it was under the court of the Griesenberg family, which was a side branch of the Bussnang family.  It was always part of the parish of Bussnang, until in 1857 Bissegg and Junkholz became part of the Reformed parish of Leutmerken.

The local economy was based on grain cultivation, and some vineyards until the 19th Century when it transitioned to cattle and dairy farming.  Starting about 1870 milk from the village went to Holzhof village in the municipality of Griesenberg.  Finally, in 1905, a cheesemaker opened in Bissegg.

Historic population
The municipality also contained the villages Holzhäusern, Hünikon and Junkholz. It had 205 inhabitants in 1870, which decreased to 187 in 1900 and 138 in 1920. It then increased, to 153 in 1950, 161 in 1960 and 185 in 1990.

References

 

Former municipalities of Thurgau
Villages in Thurgau
States and territories established in 1324